Staré Hobzí is a municipality and village in Jindřichův Hradec District in the South Bohemian Region of the Czech Republic. It has about 500 inhabitants.

Administrative parts
Villages of Janov, Nové Dvory, Nové Hobzí and Vnorovice are administrative parts of Staré Hobzí.

References

Villages in Jindřichův Hradec District